The robust burrowing scorpion (Opistophthalmus carinatus) is a widespread species of scorpion in the drier regions of southern Africa. It is a burrowing scorpion, which often places its burrow beside a large rock. Compared to others of its genus, it has a particularly sturdy body with large pinchers.

References

External links
The page of the Scorpionidae family at the Scorpion files

Scorpionidae
Scorpions of Africa
Animals described in 1861
Taxa named by Wilhelm Peters